Manni, der Libero is a 1982 German television series starring Tommi Ohrner.

External links
 

1982 German television series debuts
1982 German television series endings
German children's television series
German sports television series
German-language television shows
ZDF original programming